Achickal is a small village in Kottayam district of Kerala, south India. The road passing through here is the State Highway 1 ( Thiruvananthapuram to Angamaly). The village's economy depends mainly on crop plantations like rubber, cocoa, pepper and ginger.  Points of interest  include St. Joseph Church Udayagiri , Ilamthuruthy Rock, Little Flower School, Little Flower Convent, Holy Family Convent, Madhur Cable Vision, Jojohns Mini Mart.

Access
To reach Achickal from Ernakulam, one must catch a bus to Palai and get off at Monippally. From Monippally one can reach Achickal by hiring a vehicle, or by KSRTC ordinary and fast passenger bus.

References

Villages in Kottayam district